Reticulocalbin-2 is a protein that in humans is encoded by the RCN2 gene.

Reticulocalbin 2 is a calcium-binding protein located in the lumen of the ER. The protein contains six conserved regions with similarity to a high affinity Ca(+2)-binding motif, the EF-hand. The RCN2 gene maps to the same region as type 4 Bardet-Biedl syndrome (MIM:600374), suggesting a possible causative role for reticulocalbin 2 in the disorder.

References

Further reading

EF-hand-containing proteins